Elizabeth Capell, Countess of Essex (1 December 1636 – 5 February 1718; née Percy) was an English noblewoman, the daughter of Algernon Percy, 10th Earl of Northumberland. She was the wife of Arthur Capell, 1st Earl of Essex. Elizabeth was the subject of a portrait by court painter Sir Peter Lely.

Family
Lady Elizabeth was born on 1 December 1636 at Petworth Manor, Sussex, England, one of the five daughters of Algernon Percy, 10th Earl of Northumberland by his first wife, Lady Anne Cecil. She had one older surviving sister, Anne who married Philip Stanhope, 2nd Earl of Chesterfield. Her paternal grandparents were Henry Percy, 9th Earl of Northumberland, known by his sobriquet of The Wizard Earl, and Dorothy Devereux, the sister of Robert Devereux, 2nd Earl of Essex.

Elizabeth's maternal grandparents were William Cecil, 2nd Earl of Salisbury and Lady Catherine Howard. When Elizabeth was just a year old, her mother died; her father married secondly in 1642, Lady Elizabeth Howard. Elizabeth had a younger half-brother from her father's second marriage, Joceline Percy, 11th Earl of Northumberland.

Marriage and issue
On 19 May 1653 at Petworth, Elizabeth married Arthur Capell, 2nd Baron Capell of Hadham. On 20 August 1661, he was created Viscount Malden and the first Earl of Essex by King Charles II of England; Elizabeth was henceforth styled as the Countess of Essex. The marriage produced one surviving son and a daughter:
 Algernon Capell, 2nd Earl of Essex (28 December 1670 – 10 January 1710), married Mary Bentinck, by whom he had one son William Capell, 3rd Earl of Essex who in his turn married Lady Jane Hyde, by whom he had issue.
 Anne de Vere Capell (1675- 14 October 1752), married on 25 July 1688, Charles Howard, 3rd Earl of Carlisle, by whom she had two sons and four daughters. She had five other sons who all died in early infancy.
 Unknown Child (1668- )  

In 1672, Elizabeth's husband was made a Privy Counsellor, and appointed Lord Lieutenant of Ireland. He was dedicated to stamping out English corruption in Ireland; one of his many acts was to prevent Phoenix Park in Dublin from being granted to King Charles's former mistress Barbara Villiers who had been promised the Park as well as the fertile lands surrounding it as a gift from the king. In point of fact, it was due to the Earl of Essex that Phoenix Park continues to exist in the 21st century.

In 1677, the Essexes returned to England; in 1679, the Earl was appointed First Lord of the Treasury. He was implicated in the Rye House Plot in June 1683 and sent to the Tower of London. It was there on 13 July 1683 that he committed suicide by cutting his own throat, leaving Elizabeth a widow at the age of forty-six. She never remarried.

Death
She died on 5 February 1718, and was buried in Watford, Hertfordshire.

Art

Elizabeth Percy was the subject of a portrait by the celebrated court painter, Sir Peter Lely. It was painted in 1653, the year of her marriage, when she was sixteen years old.

Ancestry

References

1636 births
1718 deaths
English countesses
Daughters of British earls
People from Petworth
Elizabeth
Elizabeth
17th-century English women